The Saqqaq culture (named after the Saqqaq settlement, the site of many archaeological finds) was a Paleo-Eskimo culture in southern Greenland. Up to this day, no other people seem to have lived in Greenland continually for as long as the Saqqaq.

Timeframe
The earliest known archaeological culture in southern Greenland, the Saqqaq existed from around 2500 BCE until about 800 BCE. This culture coexisted with the Independence I culture of northern Greenland, which developed around 2400 BCE and lasted until about 1300 BCE. After the Saqqaq culture disappeared, the Independence II culture of northern Greenland and the Early Dorset culture of West Greenland emerged. There is some debate about the timeframe of the transition from Saqqaq culture to Early Dorset in western Greenland.

The Saqqaq culture came in two phases, the main difference of the two being that the newer phase adopted the use of sandstone. The younger phase of the Saqqaq culture coincides with the oldest phase of the Dorset culture.

Archaeological findings
Frozen remains of a Saqqaq person dubbed "Inuk" were found in western Greenland (Qeqertarsuaq) and have been DNA sequenced. He had brown eyes, black hair, and shovel-shaped teeth. It has been determined that he lived about 4000 years ago, and was related to native populations in northeastern Siberia. The Saqqaq people are not the ancestors of contemporary Kalaallit people, but instead are related to modern Chukchi and Koryak peoples. It is not known whether they crossed in boats or over ice.

Saqqaq people lived in small tents and hunted seals, seabirds, and other marine animals.
The people of the Saqqaq culture used silicified slate, agate, quartzite, and rock crystals as materials for their tools.

Genetics

A genetic study published in Science in August 2014 examined the remains of six Saqqaq individuals buried in Qeqertasussuk, Greenland between ca. 3000 BC and 1900 BC. The five samples of mtDNA extracted belonged to haplogroups D2a1 (four samples) and D2a. These haplogroups also predominate in the Dorset culture, and are today found in high frequencies among Siberian Yupik and Aleut, with whom the Saqqaq are relatively closely related. The evidence suggested that the ancestors of the Saqqaq entered North America from Siberia through a distinct migration about 4000 BC, and that they subsequently remained largely genetically isolated from other North American populations.

See also 
 Dorset culture
 Thule people
 Qilakitsoq

References

Sources

Further reading

External links
4000 year old remains

Archaeological cultures of North America
Archaeology of Greenland
Prehistory of the Arctic